The Isaac Pollack House is a historic structure now located at 208 West Monument Avenue in Dayton, Ohio, United States.  Built in 1876, this Second Empire house was originally home to the family of Isaac Pollack, a prominent Dayton businessman involved in the liqueur trade.  The walls are composed of a mixture of stone and brick with some wooden elements, resting on a stone foundation and covered with a slate roof.

The house ceased to be used primarily as a residence in 1913.  In that year, Fenton T. Bott purchased the house and began using it as the home of his Bott Dancing Academy, as well as his residence; he remained in business until 1941.  Fifteen years later, the Montgomery County Board of Elections began a twenty-year period of using the property as their offices.  In 1979, the house was moved from its previous location at 319 West Third Street to a new location at the intersection of Wilkinson Street and Monument Avenue.  Its new location places it on the northern edge of downtown, just one block from the Great Miami River, across from McPherson Town, and near Interstate 75. From October 14, 2005, to September 2021, the structure was the home of the Dayton International Peace Museum.

Two weeks before Christmas 1974, the Pollack House was listed on the National Register of Historic Places, qualifying both because of its architecture and because of its place as the residence of a prominent local citizen.  It is one of approximately one hundred National Register-listed locations citywide and one of four on Monument Avenue, along with the old YMCA, the Engineers Club of Dayton, and the now-destroyed Hanitch-Huffman House.

See also
 National Register of Historic Places listings in Dayton, Ohio

References

Houses completed in 1876
Dance schools in the United States
Defunct schools in Ohio
Defunct schools of the performing arts in the United States
Former houses in Ohio
Houses in Dayton, Ohio
Museums in Dayton, Ohio
National Register of Historic Places in Montgomery County, Ohio
Second Empire architecture in Ohio